Davey Winder, previously known as "Wavey Davey" or "dwindera" but now settled as "happygeek", is a United Kingdom IT pundit who has worked as a consultant, writer and journalist.  He was the 'IT Security Journalist of the Year (UK)' three times, in 2006, 2008 and 2010.

Biography
After viral encephalitis left him severely disabled, he first got a computer to use video games to improve the coordination in the remaining arm in which he had the power of movement. He then used a word processor to learn how to read and write again, with the help of his late father and numerous Janet and John kids' books.  The disease had also changed his personality, devastating his marriage and social life.  After experiments with Prestel, he found an early British online community, CIX, in the late 1980s, before direct connections to the internet were cheaply available outside academia, and this provided him with a new social and business life.  Winder was contacted through CIX email over the internet by technological culture writer Howard Rheingold, a habitué of The Well, another early online community-based in the United States, and eventually the two met in person at Winder's home; the meeting is described in Rheingold's book, The Virtual Community. A prolific author himself, Winder has had more than 20 books published. The most recent, Being Virtual, in conjunction with the Science Museum, in London which explores the realm of virtual identity and is part auto-biographical in nature. Winder is now fully recovered and no longer needs a wheelchair.

Publications
 (1994.) "All you need to know about using the net." Future publications.
 (1995.) "All you need to know about business on-line." Future publications.
 (1995.) "Inside the Internet: getting the most from the Net." Future publications.
 (1996.) "Sex and the Internet." Future publications.
 (2008.) "Being virtual: who you really are online." Wiley.

References

External links
 The Virtual Community by Howard Rheingold, Chapter eight is about Davey Winder.

Living people
British Internet celebrities
Year of birth missing (living people)
20th-century British journalists
21st-century British journalists